Krāslava District was an administrative division of Latvia, located in  Latgale region, in the country's east. It was organized into two cities and twenty three parishes, each with a local government authority. The main city in the district was Krāslava.

The district was eliminated during the administrative-territorial reform in 2009, most of its part being divided between Dagda and Krāslava municipalities and three parishes in north-west joining Aglona Municipality.

Cities, municipalities and parishes of Krāslava District

 Andrupene parish
 Andzeļi parish
 Asūne parish
 Auleja parish
 Bērziņi parish
 Dagda city
 Dagda parish
 Ezernieki parish
 Grāveri parish
 Indra parish
 Izvalta parish
 Kalnieši parish
 Kaplava parish
 Kastuļina parish
 Kombuļi parish
 Konstantinova parish
 Krāslava city
 Krāslava parish
 Ķepova parish
 Piedruja parish
 Robežnieki parish
 Skaista parish
 Svariņi parish
 Šķaune parish
 Šķeltova parish
 Ūdrīši parish

References 

Districts of Latvia